Knut Stiklestad (born 22 September 1948) is a Norwegian opera singer (bass). He has performed at the Norwegian National Opera and Ballet for many years, and at opera houses abroad, in Belgium, France, the Netherlands, and elsewhere. He has worked with Stein Winge, Bentein Baardson, and Wouter van Looy, among others. Stiklestad is also known for his work in church music. He has also cooperated with the composer Marcus Paus on work based on poems by Knut Hamsun.

Discography
Tonar i frå Trøndelag
Toner fra Nidaros
Det vilde kor by Knut Hamsun/Marcus Paus
Peer Gynt, Malmö Symphonic Orchestra

References

1948 births
Living people
20th-century Norwegian male opera singers
21st-century Norwegian male opera singers